CHUT-FM is a Canadian radio station, broadcasting at 95.3 FM in Lac-Simon, Quebec. A community radio station for the Algonquin Nation Anishinabe du Lac Simon, the station also has a rebroadcaster in Val-d'Or on 92.5 FM (CHUT-FM-1)  and another in Rouyn-Noranda on 98.3 FM with the callsign CHUN-FM.

References

External links

 
 
 

Hut
Hut
Year of establishment missing